Brian Andersen (born 13 March 1971) is a Danish former international motorcycle speedway rider.

Career
Andersen reached the final of the Under-21 World Championship in 1990 and then won the event the following year  to become the 1991 Junior World Champion The success brought him to the attention of British leagues and Coventry Bees signed him for the 1992 British League season.

He drove up his average over the following seasons for Coventry and established himself as one of their leading riders. In 1995, he won the Individual Speedway Danish Championship. In 1996, he finished second in the 1996 Intercontinental Final, which qualified him for his first Speedway Grand Prix series.

He rode in the Grand Prix between 1997 and 2001, and won two bronze medals in the Speedway World Team Cup. He won the Danish Championship for the second time in 1999, which was also his last season for Coventry before he moved to join Oxford Cheetahs for the 2000 Elite League speedway season.

In 2001, he was part of the Oxford Cheetahs title winning team in 2001.

Family
His son Mikkel Andersen is also a speedway rider and the 2022 FIM Speedway Youth World Championship (SGP3) world champion.

Major results

World individual Championship
1997 Speedway Grand Prix - 6th (80 pts) including winning the 1997 Speedway Grand Prix of Great Britain
1998 Speedway Grand Prix - 16th (31 pts)
1999 Speedway Grand Prix - 22nd (12 pts)
2000 Speedway Grand Prix - 23rd (15 pts)
2001 Speedway Grand Prix - 18th (23 pts)

World team Championships
1996 Speedway World Team Cup - bronze medal
1998 Speedway World Team Cup - bronze medal
2000 Speedway World Team Cup  - =5th
2001 Speedway World Cup - 4th

See also 
 Denmark national speedway team
 List of Speedway Grand Prix riders

References 

1971 births
Living people
Danish speedway riders
Oxford Cheetahs riders